Total War: Shogun 2: Fall of the Samurai is a standalone expansion to the strategy video game Total War: Shogun 2, released on 23 March 2012. It is set during the mid 19th-century Bakumatsu era which also includes the Meiji Restoration, when the arrival of Western powers forced Japan's government to modernize and eventually abolish its traditional samurai-based shogunate. The game was rebranded and released as a separate product Total War Saga: Fall of the Samurai on August 13, 2019.

Gameplay

This standalone expansion focuses on the conflicts between the Imperialists and the Shogunists in the final years of Tokugawa Shogunate, which takes place 300 years after the events of the original game. Gameplay is a mix of traditional Samurai culture mainly seen in the original game and the power of modern weaponry which is seen more in this version. The general objective for the player is to guide ancient Japan into the modern age, as the arrival of Western Powers will coincide with a civil war, which will seal the future of a nation.

Railways make an appearance in the game, allowing for much faster troop movement on the campaign map. The Gatling gun appears in the game. Artillery units and ships can now bombard enemy units directly on the campaign map. Likewise, coastal guns can now be built to counter such bombardment. Since ships in the expansion are now steam-powered, there are significant changes in naval warfare and tactics from previous games.

Graphics-wise, the game utilizes an improved Warscape engine, adding enhancements to the Campaign Map, improved water effects and more. This engine update has also added numerous performance improvements.

The player can choose to play on either the Imperial or the Shogunate side. Including all of the Fall of the Samurai DLC, there are five Imperial and five Shogunate clans to choose from. It is possible to convert your clan's allegiance from Shogunate to Imperial, or vice versa, in the early (but not the later) stages of the campaign. There are ten major domains that inhabit the provinces of Japan which the player chooses from. All clans have particular advantages in certain areas, to give a variety of play style with each.

Shogunate Factions

 Aizu Domain, starting in Fukushima.
 Nagaoka Domain, starting in Echigo Province.
 Jōzai Domain, starting in Kazusa Province.
 Obama Domain, starting in Wakasa Province.
 Sendai Domain, starting in Miyagi.

Imperial Factions

 Satsuma Domain, starting in Satsuma Province and Osumi Province.
 Choshu Domain, starting in Nagato Province.
 Tosa Domain, starting in Tosa Province.
 Saga Domain, starting in Nagasaki.
 Tsu Domain, starting in Iga Province.

Similarly to Shogun 2, the realm divide system is triggered when the player gains enough fame by capturing enough territories, though with a few differences. The player will have the option to side with the emperor or shogun or to form a new republic (based on the historical Republic of Ezo). The latter option will result in all other computer surviving clans declaring war on the player one by one. The former will only result in clans of the opposing side declaring war on the player and forbids the player from declaring war on their allies.

Development

Reception

References 

2012 video games
Japan in non-Japanese culture
Linux games
MacOS games
Real-time tactics video games
Sega video games
Video games with Steam Workshop support
Creative Assembly games
Total War (video game series)
Turn-based strategy video games
Video games about samurai
Video games set in feudal Japan
Video games with expansion packs
Windows games
Video games set in the 19th century
Multiplayer and single-player video games
Feral Interactive games
Video games scored by Jeff van Dyck
Video games developed in the United Kingdom